Three Mile Bay is a hamlet and census-designated place (CDP) in the town of Lyme in Jefferson County, New York, United States. As of the 2010 census it had a population of 227.

The hamlet has its own post office, a volunteer fire company, and boat launches for fishing and recreation in the various outlying bays that draw from Lake Ontario and the St. Lawrence seaway.

History
The community was settled between 1810 and 1820. Early resident Asa Wilcox built 48 brigs, propellers, schooners, and other seafaring vessels from 1835 to 1853. Some of these vessels, like the A.E. Vickery, ultimately joined the more than 500 shipwrecked vessels now resting at the bottom of the St. Lawrence River and Lake Ontario.

Geography
Three Mile Bay is in western Jefferson County, at the head of a bay of the same name, an inlet to Chaumont Bay of Lake Ontario. The community is in the western part of the town of Lyme along New York State Route 12E, which leads northwest  to Cape Vincent on the St. Lawrence River and southeast  to Watertown, the Jefferson county seat.

Demographics

References

Hamlets in New York (state)
Census-designated places in New York (state)
Census-designated places in Jefferson County, New York
Hamlets in Jefferson County, New York